Alexander Shevchenko was the defending champion but withdrew before his first round match.

Matteo Arnaldi won the title after defeating Raúl Brancaccio 6–1, 6–2 in the final.

Seeds

Draw

Finals

Top half

Bottom half

References

External links
Main draw
Qualifying draw

Tenerife Challenger II - 1
Tenerife Challenger